Ben M'Sick or Ben Msik is an arrondissement of Casablanca, in the Ben M'Sick district of the Casablanca-Settat region of Morocco. As of 2004 it had 163,052 inhabitants.

References

Arrondissements of Casablanca